Glochidion pitcairnense is a species of plant in the family Phyllanthaceae. It occurs only in the Henderson and Pitcairn Islands in the southern Pacific Ocean, with respective populations of approximately 20,000 and 500.

References

pitcairnense
Flora of the Pitcairn Islands
Vulnerable plants
Taxonomy articles created by Polbot